The 1950 Montana Grizzlies football team represented the University of Montana in the 1950 college football season. The Grizzlies were led by second-year head coach Ted Shipkey, played their home games at Dornblaser Field and finished the season with a record of five wins and five losses (5–5).

This was Montana's first season out of the Pacific Coast Conference and they competed as an independent; they played four PCC opponents, one more than the previous year. Montana joined the Skyline Conference for the 1951 season.

Schedule

The Eastern Washington game did not award the Governors Cup until 39 years later in 1998.

References

Montana
Montana Grizzlies football seasons
Montana Grizzlies football